The 1942 UK & Ireland Greyhound Racing Year was the 17th year of greyhound racing in the United Kingdom and Ireland.

Summary
The year continued to be dominated by the effect of World War II. The only major races that had not been suspended were the Irish Greyhound Derby and Scottish Greyhound Derby. Many race meetings held throughout the country helped with the war effort with money collections made frequently for various funds. The crowds remained healthy and the racing provided a welcome distraction from the war.

The distraction was so significant that the annual totalisator turnover set another new record, reaching £49,989,183, government tax and track deduction remained at 6% each respectively. An example of the sports popularity was highlighted at the House of Commons when an issue was addressed. The issue concerned was when upwards of 500 personnel at an aircraft factory left without permission to attend an afternoon greyhound meeting.

Ballynennan Moon
Ballynennan Moon returned after a winter rest and won the Walthamstow Stakes and Wimbledon Spring Cup. In his next 48 races, he was to win on forty occasions and finish second seven times. After finishing first, fourteen times in succession, he seemed certain to beat Mick the Miller's 19 straight wins but, in the fifteenth race, he was beaten a neck by Laughing Lackey. He then went on to record another eight successive wins during a five-month period and became a household name. He won the Wimbledon Spring Cup, the 1,000 Guineas at Park Royal Stadium, the Wembley Summer Cup, the Eclipse at Coventry, the Stewards Cup at Walthamstow Stadium and at the end of the year the International at Wimbledon Stadium.

Competitions
The fawn dog Ballycurreen Soldier won the Scottish Derby for the second time, the veteran racer was running in his fourth consecutive final.

News
Leading trainer Joe Harmon died, leaving a huge gap to fill in the trainers ranks. A race would be initiated in his honour and the race would aptly be won by the best greyhound in training, Ballynennan Moon. Alfred Critchley became the Chairman of the Greyhound Racing Association, in place of the late Edward Loch, 2nd Baron Loch.

Ireland
The Irish Derby moved back to a more traditional slot at the end of May and was held at Cork Greyhound Stadium. It was only the second time the classic was run outside Dublin. Cork had won the rights to host due to the unfortunate circumstances that had stopped them from holding the event the year before (Foot-and-mouth disease). The first prize was only £175, the lowest on record but the track experienced record crowds. John Crowley a local pub owner in Cork trained Uacterlainn Riac to success for his brother Jerry who owned the dog. Uacterlainn Riac (meaning Creamery Brindle) attempted hurdles after the Derby but failed to take to them and plans for a Grand National double were scrapped.

Roll of honour

Totalisator Returns

The totalisator returns declared to the licensing authorities for the year 1942 are listed below. Tracks that did not have a totalisator in operation are not listed.

Summary

References 

Greyhound racing in the United Kingdom
Greyhound racing in the Republic of Ireland
UK and Ireland Greyhound Racing Year
UK and Ireland Greyhound Racing Year
UK and Ireland Greyhound Racing Year
UK and Ireland Greyhound Racing Year